The orange-collared keelback (Rhabdophis himalayanus) is a species of snake. As with its congenerics, this is a reared-fanged species. The toxicity of its venom is not known, but it overpowers its prey quickly. Even if it is considered harmless, an allergic reaction from the bite can still occur, and all bites should be taken seriously.

Description
Dorsally it is olive with small dark spots and two longitudinal series of small whitish spots or narrow crossbars. Behind the head there is an orange or yellow collar, usually interrupted on the midline, followed by a blackish blotch on the nape. The upper labials are yellowish with black sutures. Ventrally it is yellowish, speckled with brown or black, or entirely grayish olive or blackish.  It may attain 83 cm (33 inches) in total length, tail 20 cm (8 inches).

Distribution
India (Sikkim, Assam; Arunachal Pradesh (Siddi (=Gandhigram), Miao - Changlang district, Chimpu, Itanagar - Papum Pare district, Pasighat, Boleng - East Siang district) ), Bhutan, Bangladesh,  Nepal, N Myanmar (Burma), China (Yunnan, Yizang/Tibet).

Type locality: "Nepal"

References
Notes

Sources
 Boulenger, George A. 1890 The Fauna of British India, Including Ceylon and Burma. Reptilia and Batrachia. Taylor & Francis, London, xviii, 541 pp.
 Günther, A. 1864 The Reptiles of British India. London (Taylor & Francis), xxvii + 452 pp.

Rhabdophis
Reptiles of Bangladesh
Reptiles of Bhutan
Reptiles of Myanmar
Reptiles of China
Reptiles of India
Reptiles of Nepal
Reptiles described in 1864
Taxa named by Albert Günther